Hard Eight (originally titled Sydney) is a 1996 American crime film written and directed by Paul Thomas Anderson in his feature directorial debut, and starring Philip Baker Hall, John C. Reilly, Gwyneth Paltrow and Samuel L. Jackson. It is the expansion of the short film Cigarettes & Coffee. The film follows the life of a senior gambler and a homeless man. It premiered at the 1996 Cannes Film Festival.

Plot
Sydney Brown, a well-dressed senior gambler, finds John Finnegan, a homeless man, forlornly sitting outside a diner in Sparks, Nevada. He offers him a cigarette and buys him a cup of coffee. John tells Sydney that he lost his money in Las Vegas and he needs $6,000 for his mother's funeral. Sydney offers to drive John to Vegas, where he helps John win the money. Two years later, John has become Sydney's protégé. Sydney is calm and reserved and displays a fatherly care for John, who is unsophisticated. John has a new friend named Jimmy, who does security work. John is attracted to Clementine, a cocktail waitress in Reno. Sydney meets Clementine, and learns that she moonlights as a prostitute. Although Clementine believes Sydney might want to use her services, he wants to build a connection between her and John. Sydney asks John to show Clementine around the town.

After receiving a frantic phone call, Sydney finds John and Clementine holding a tourist hostage in a nearby motel when the client of Clementine's did not pay her $300. John reveals that he and Clementine impulsively got married, and Clementine prostituted herself to the tourist, who is knocked out and handcuffed to the bed. Sydney learns that John and Clementine have called the hostage's wife, threatening to kill him if they do not get the money. After finding Jimmy's gun, Sydney convinces them to flee the motel, advising John and Clementine to leave town for a honeymoon. While leaving, Sydney removes the evidence from the motel room.

Sydney meets with Jimmy, who tells him that the couple did not call the police. However, Jimmy explains that he has heard stories of Sydney killing John's father in Atlantic City. Jimmy pulls a gun on Sydney and threatens to tell John unless Sydney gives him $10,000. Sydney says that he does not have it, but he can give $6,000 cash. They go to Jimmy's suite, and then down to the casino floor where Sydney gets the money from the cashier and gives it to Jimmy. John calls Sydney from a roadside phone to update Sydney on their honeymoon trip. During the call, Sydney tells John that he loves him like a son. After hearing that, John cries, thanks him and says that he loves him too. Sydney sneaks into Jimmy's house, kills him and retrieves the money. The next day, Sydney returns to the diner where he met John and covers his bloodstained shirt cuff with a jacket sleeve.

Cast
 Philip Baker Hall as Sydney Brown
 John C. Reilly as John Finnegan
 Gwyneth Paltrow as Clementine
 Samuel L. Jackson as Jimmy
 Philip Seymour Hoffman as young craps player
 Robert Ridgely as Keno Bar Manager
 Melora Walters as Jimmy's Girl

Production
Originally titled Sydney, it was Anderson's first feature film and the expansion of the short film Cigarettes & Coffee. The main character Sydney was named after Hall's previous role in Midnight Run. Hall, Walters, Reilly and Hoffman later appeared in Boogie Nights and Magnolia.

Release
The film premiered in the Un Certain Regard section at the 1996 Cannes Film Festival. In 2018, Anderson said he was working on a Blu-ray release of the film. An Australian Blu-ray was released by Viavision in October 2020 with two commentaries, a deleted scene and footage from the Sundance Institute Filmmaker Lab.

Reception
Roger Ebert gave the film three and a half stars out of four, writing "Movies like Hard Eight remind me of what original, compelling characters the movies can sometimes give us." Stephen Holden of The New York Times wrote "Hard Eight is not a movie that wants to make a grand statement. It is really little more than a small resonant mood piece whose hard-bitten characters are difficult to like. But within its self-imposed limitations, it accomplishes most of what it sets out to do. And the acting is wonderfully understated, economical and unsentimental." On Rotten Tomatoes, the film has an approval rating of 82% based on 49 reviews, with an average rating of 6.9/10. The website's critical consensus reads, "An absorbing showcase for Philip Baker Hall, Paul Thomas Anderson's feature debut is a gamble that pays off handsomely." It is described by some authors as a neo-noir film.

See also
 List of films set in Las Vegas

References

External links

 
 
 
 
 
 

1996 films
1996 crime drama films
American crime drama films
American independent films
American neo-noir films
1990s English-language films
Features based on short films
Films directed by Paul Thomas Anderson
Films scored by Jon Brion
Films scored by Michael Penn
Films set in the Las Vegas Valley
Films set in Reno, Nevada
Films with screenplays by Paul Thomas Anderson
Films about gambling
The Samuel Goldwyn Company films
Rysher Entertainment films
1996 directorial debut films
1996 independent films
1990s American films